The 82nd parallel north is a circle of latitude that is 82 degrees north of the Earth's equatorial plane, in the Arctic. It passes through the Arctic Ocean and North America.

At this latitude the sun is visible for 24 hours, 0 minutes during the summer solstice and astronomical twilight during the winter solstice.

The northernmost permanent settlement is at this latitude, in the city of Alert, Nunavut. This town has a population of 62.

Around the world
Starting at the Prime Meridian and heading eastwards, the parallel 82° north passes through:

{| class="wikitable plainrowheaders"
! scope="col" width="125" | Co-ordinates
! scope="col" | Country, territory or sea
! scope="col" | Notes
|-
| style="background:#b0e0e6;" | 
! scope="row" style="background:#b0e0e6;" | Arctic Ocean
| style="background:#b0e0e6;" | Passing just north of Rudolf Island, Franz Josef Land, 
|-
| 
! scope="row" | 
| Nunavut - Ellesmere Island
|-
| style="background:#b0e0e6;" | 
! scope="row" style="background:#b0e0e6;" | Nares Strait
| style="background:#b0e0e6;" |
|-
| 
! scope="row" | 
| Nyeboe Land
|-
| style="background:#b0e0e6;" | 
! scope="row" style="background:#b0e0e6;" | St George Fjord
| style="background:#b0e0e6;" |
|-
| 
! scope="row" | 
| Hendrik Island
|-
| style="background:#b0e0e6;" | 
! scope="row" style="background:#b0e0e6;" | Sherard Osborn Fjord
| style="background:#b0e0e6;" |
|-
| 
! scope="row" | 
|Wulff Land
|-
| style="background:#b0e0e6;" | 
! scope="row" style="background:#b0e0e6;" | Victoria Fjord
| style="background:#b0e0e6;" |
|-
| 
! scope="row" | 
|Christian Erichsen Ice Cap 
|-
| style="background:#b0e0e6;" | 
! scope="row" style="background:#b0e0e6;" | Independence Fjord
| style="background:#b0e0e6;" |
|-
| 
! scope="row" | 
|Cape Peter Henrik
|-
| style="background:#b0e0e6;" | 
! scope="row" style="background:#b0e0e6;" | Hagen Fjord
| style="background:#b0e0e6;" |
|-
| 
! scope="row" | 
|Cape Rigsdagen
|-
| style="background:#b0e0e6;" | 
! scope="row" style="background:#b0e0e6;" | Arctic Ocean
| style="background:#b0e0e6;" |Wandel Sea
|-
| 
! scope="row" | 
| Princess Thyra Island
|-
| style="background:#b0e0e6;" | 
! scope="row" style="background:#b0e0e6;" | Arctic Ocean
| style="background:#b0e0e6;" |Wandel Sea
|-
| 
! scope="row" | 
| Princess Margaret Island
|-
| style="background:#b0e0e6;" | 
! scope="row" style="background:#b0e0e6;" | Arctic Ocean
| style="background:#b0e0e6;" |
|-
|}

See also
81st parallel north
83rd parallel north

n82
Geography of the Arctic